Antraigues-sur-Volane (literally Antraigues on Volane) is a former commune in the Ardèche department in the Auvergne-Rhône-Alpes region of southern France. On 1 January 2019, it was merged into the new commune Vallées-d'Antraigues-Asperjoc.

The inhabitants of the commune are known as Antraiguains or Antraiguaines or alternatively as Antraiguais or Antraiguaises.

Geography

Location
Antraigues-sur-Volane is located 5 kilometres north of Vals-les-Bains and 14 km north of Aubenas. The village lies on the edge of the Ardèche Cévennes with the northern boundary ending at the Mézilhac Pass and the Vivarais Mountains.

Access to the commune is on the D578 road from Val-les-Bains in the south to the village then continuing north through the heart of the commune to Laviolle in the north. There is also the D254 going west from the D578 just outside the village via a mountainous route to Labastide-sur-Besorgues in the west. Similarly the D318 road goes east from the village by a mountainous route to Genestelle in the east. The commune is mountainous with some mountain roads accessing parts of the commune.

Hydrology
The Volane river flows from the north through the commune where it is joined by many tributaries including the Ruisseau de Rouyon, the Ruisseau du Bouchet, the Ruisseau des Fuels, the Rivière de Bise, the Ruisseau de Coupe (which forms the southern border of the commune), and many other unnamed streams.

Neighbouring communes and villages

History
In 1841 the commune of Laviolle was created from a part of Antraigues.
Antraigues took its current name on 20 August 1989.

In the 1960s Mayor Jean Saussac brought in many artists such as Jacques Brel, Lino Ventura, Pierre Brasseur, Claude Nougaro, Alexander Calder, Allain Leprest Francesca Solleville, Aubret Isabelle and Jean Ferrat, who settled permanently in the village and became deputy mayors in charge of culture. As a result, the nickname "Little Saint Tropez of the Ardèche" was attributed to the commune.

Administration

List of Successive Mayors of Antraigues-sur-Volane

Demography

Distribution of Age Groups

The population of the town is relatively old. The rate of persons above the age of 60 years (48%) is significantly higher than the departmental level (31%).

Culture and heritage

Civil heritage
A Tower on the village hilltop

Religious heritage
The Chapel of Saint-Roch
The Parish Church contains a number of items that are registered as historical objects:
A Statue: The Virgin of the Immaculate Conception bringing down the serpent (19th century)
A Statue: Saint Roch (19th century)
A Statue: Saint Philomene (19th century)
A Statue: Saint Jean François Régis (19th century)
A Painting: Saint Bauzille, martyred deacon (19th century)

Environmental heritage
The commune has been an integral part of the Regional Natural Park of Monts d'Ardèche since its inception on 9 April 2001. The commune has two ZNIEFF type II areas in its territory named:
"Line of the crest of the Mézilhac to the Escrinet Pass"
"Watersheds of the Volane, the Dorne, and the Bézorgues" 

The town also includes four ZNIEFF type I areas:
"Rocks and moors of the volcano forest"
"Streams of the Volane, the Mas, the Bise, and the Gamondes"
"Plateau of Pradou and the Field of Mars"
"Slopes of the Crau volcano"

Panoramic view

Notable People linked to the commune

Jean-Louis Giraud-Soulavie (1752-1813), also known as Father Soulavie, geologist, diplomat, a native of Antraigues although born in Largentière, appointed vicar of Antraigues in 1776
Louis-Alexandre de Launay, Count of Antraigues (1753-1812)
Antoinette Saint-Huberty (1756-1812), famous opera singer, wife of Louis-Alexandre de Launay, Countess of Antraigues
François-Joseph Gamon (1767-1832), French politician, born in Antraigues
Edouard Froment (1884-1973), MP for the Ardeche and former President of the General Council of the Ardèche, died at Antraigues on 13 March 1973
Jean Saussac (1922-2005), painter, former mayor of Antraigues and decorator for films including Le Vieux Fusil, Le Secret, and Les Grandes gueules
Jean Ferrat (1930-2010), poet, lyricist, and French singer. Antraigues, where he settled in 1964, inspired him including his song La Montagne. He was deputy mayor during the 1970s. He is buried in the local cemetery with his brother André
Christine Sèvres born Boissonnet (1931-1981), wife of Jean Ferrat
Michel Teston (1944- ), General Counsel for the canton, Senator for the Ardeche, and former president of the General Council of the Ardèche
Allain Leprest (1954-2011), French poet and singer, died in Antraigues on 15 August 2011

See also
Communes of the Ardèche department
Jean Ferrat

References

External links

Antraigues-sur-Volane on Géoportail, National Geographic Institute (IGN) website 
Antraigues on the 1750 Cassini Map

Former communes of Ardèche
Populated places disestablished in 2019
States and territories disestablished in 2019